Quincy Sumbo Ayodele, popularly known as Quincy, is a Nigerian herbal medicine practitioner, entrepreneur, herbal slimming and skin care expert and the Chief Executive Officer of Quincy Herbals, a Nigerian leading herbal healthcare center. She is a World Health Organization expert committee member on the development of African traditional medicine and practices. She is an advocate for the integration of African traditional medicine into the healthcare system.

Quincy is the founder of the Herbal Slimmers and Weight Loss Association of Nigeria and pioneer Secretary General of the National Association of Nigerian Traditional Medicine Practitioners (NANTMP). She established a not-for-profit organization, Self-Employed Women Association of Nigeria (SEWAN), which focuses on women's entrepreneurship. Prior to establishing Quincy Herbals, she was a secretary at Societe Generale Bank Nigeria Limited where she later became the personal assistant to the managing director of the bank.

Early life and career
She was born in Abeokuta, the capital of Ogun State, Nigeria into the family of the late Chief Amos Oluwole Sodimu. She stayed with her grandmother, Mabel Osunmi Sodimu in Olorunsogo village after her parents moved to United Kingdom from whom she learned herbal medicine. She attended African Church Primary School in Yambi Village and Comprehensive High School, Ayetoro also in Ogun state before she attended Ogun State Polytechnic for a diploma but left the institution before the final examination to attend Pitman's Central College, London, where she obtained a higher diploma in secretarial administration. She returned to Nigeria, joined the services of Societe Generale Bank Nigeria Limited as secretary, and later became the personal assistant to the managing director of the bank.

She resigned after more than 12 years of service in the banking sector to establish her own business. Prior to setting up Quincy Herbals, she obtained a diploma in natural medicine from the Nigerian College of Natural Medicine, a subsidiary of Federal Ministry of Science and Technology, Victoria Island, Lagos. She also studied naturopathy in the United States and attended several seminars on the practice of traditional medicine in China.

She established Quincy Herbals with five thousand naira ($18 as of 6 July 2016). Part of the fund was obtained from the sales of puff-puff.

Quincy is an expert committee member to the World Health Organization on the development of African traditional medicine and practices. She is an advocate for the integration of African traditional medicine into the healthcare system. She is the founder of Herbal Slimmers and Weight Loss Association of Nigeria and pioneer Secretary General of the National Association of Nigerian Traditional Medicine Practitioners (NANTMP) She also established a not-for-profit organization, Self-Employed Women Association of Nigeria (SEWAN) that focuses on women's entrepreneurship.

Personal life
Quincy is married to Engr. John Oladipo Ayodele. Together they have three children: Tobi Ayodele Keeney,  who received a master's degree in nursing from  the University of Maryland, Baltimore, Marita Tola Abdul and John Temi Ayodele. They also have grandchildren.

See also
 Lois Auta

References

External links
 Quincy Herbals official website

Living people
Businesspeople from Lagos
21st-century Nigerian businesswomen
21st-century Nigerian businesspeople
Nigerian women company founders
Herbalists
Businesspeople from Abeokuta
Nigerian health care businesspeople
Moshood Abiola Polytechnic alumni
Year of birth missing (living people)